The 2022 Toronto FC II season is the seventh season of play in the club's history. The club moved to MLS Next Pro for the season after previously playing in USL League One.

During the regular season, Toronto FC II won the Northeast Division and finished second in the Eastern Conference. In the playoffs, they defeated Philadelphia Union 2 in the Conference Semi-Finals, before being defeated by Columbus Crew 2 in the Conference Finals, after extra time.

Team Roster
MLS Next Pro allows for up to 35 players on a roster. Roster slots 1 through 24 are reserved for players on professional contracts. The remaining 11 slots are for amateur MLS Academy players (who are unpaid, must be under the age of 21, be part of the team's academy, and have never signed a professional contract or played in the NCAA).

Coaching staff

Transfers
Note: All figures in United States dollars.

In

Transferred In

Loaned in

Out

Transferred out

Loaned out

Pre-season and friendlies

Competitions

MLS Next Pro

Standings

Match Results

Playoffs

Statistics

Goals
{| class="wikitable sortable" style="width:60%; text-align:center"
!width=15|Rank
!width=15|Nation
!width=130|Player
!width=50|MLS Next Pro
!width=50|Playoffs
!width=50|Total
|-
|1|||| Paul Rothrock || 7 || 1 ||8
|-
|rowspan=2|2|||| Reshaun Walkes || 6 || 0 ||6
|-
||| Themi Antonoglou || 4 || 2 ||6
|-
|rowspan=2|4|||| Julian Altobelli || 5 || 0 ||5
|-
||| Hugo Mbongue || 4 || 1 ||5
|-
|rowspan=2|6|||| Nakye Greenidge-Duncan || 3 || 0 ||3
|-
||| Steffen Yeates || 3 || 0 ||3
|-
|rowspan=4|8|||| Alec Díaz || 2 || 0 ||2
|-
||| Stefan Karajovanovic || 2 || 0 ||2
|-
||| Jordan Perruzza || 2 || 0 ||2
|-
||| Kobe Franklin || 1 || 0 ||1
|-
|rowspan=3|12|||| Alonso Coello Camarero || 1 || 0 ||1
|-
||| Kadin Chung || 1 || 0 ||1
|-
||| Antonio Carlini || 1 || 0 ||1
|-
|colspan="3"|Own goals 
| 1 || 0 || 1
|- class="sortbottom"
! colspan="3"|Totals||44||4||48

Shutouts
{| class="wikitable sortable" style="width:60%; text-align:center"
!width=15|Rank
!width=15|Nation
!width=130|Player
!width=15|Pos.
!width=50|MLS Next Pro
!width=50|Playoffs
!width=50|Total
|-
|1||||  Luka Gavran   || GK || 5 || 1 ||6
|-
! colspan="4"|Totals||5||1||6

References

Toronto FC II seasons
Toronto FC II
Toronto FC II
Toronto FC II